The Canton of Baie-Mahault is a former canton in the Arrondissement of Basse-Terre on the island of Guadeloupe. It had 29,976 inhabitants (2012). It was disbanded following the French canton reorganisation which came into effect in March 2015. The canton comprised the commune of Baie-Mahault.

See also
Cantons of Guadeloupe
Communes of Guadeloupe
Arrondissements of Guadeloupe

References

Former cantons of Guadeloupe
2015 disestablishments in France
States and territories disestablished in 2015